The Twenty-eighth Amendment of the Constitution (Treaty of Lisbon) Act 2009 (previously bill no. 49 of 2009) is an amendment of the Constitution of Ireland which permitted the state to ratify the Treaty of Lisbon of the European Union. It was approved by referendum on 2 October 2009 (sometimes known as the second Lisbon referendum).

The amendment was approved by the Irish electorate by 67.1% to 32.9%, on a turnout of 59%.
The amendment's enactment followed the failure of a previous attempt which was rejected in the first Lisbon referendum, held in June 2008. The successful referendum in 2009 represented a swing of 20.5% to the "Yes" side, from the result in 2008.

Following the referendum, Dáil Éireann (the lower house of parliament) gave its approval to the Treaty on 8 October 2009. The President of Ireland Mary McAleese signed the amendment of the constitution into law on 15 October.
These formalities having been conducted, the state ratified the treaty by depositing the instrument of ratification with the Italian government on 23 October. The Treaty of Lisbon entered into force on 1 December 2009.

Background

A 1987 decision of the Supreme Court established that ratification by Ireland of any significant amendment to the Treaties of the European Union requires an amendment to the Constitution of Ireland. All constitutional amendments require approval by referendum.

A referendum on the Treaty establishing a Constitution for Europe of the European Union was expected to be held in 2005 or 2006 but was cancelled following the rejection of the Constitution by voters in France in May 2005 and in the Netherlands in June 2005. The Treaty of Lisbon represents the European-wide political compromise that was agreed upon in the wake of the rejection of the Constitution. It preserves most of the content of the Constitution, especially the new rules on the functioning of the European Institutions, but gives up any symbolic reference to a Constitution. (See Treaty of Lisbon compared to the European Constitution.)

First Lisbon referendum

The 'Twenty-eighth Amendment of the Constitution Bill 2008' was a proposal to amend the Constitution of Ireland to enable ratification of the Treaty of Lisbon (also known as the Reform Treaty) of the European Union, so it could be enacted as scheduled on 1 January 2009. As part of the enactment of the bill, a referendum was held on 12 June 2008.
The proposal was defeated by 53.4% to 46.6%, with a turnout of 53.1%.

Ireland was the only EU member state that held public referendums on the Treaty. Ratification of the Treaty in all other member states is decided upon by the states' national parliaments. The referendum was part of the larger EU ratification of the Treaty, which required that all EU members and the European Parliament must ratify it. A "No" vote in the referendum could have blocked the treaty in the EU altogether. However, the Treaty of Nice was ratified by Ireland in 2002 in a second referendum after the first vote rejected it by a narrow margin in 2001.

EU member states later issued a set of guarantees to the Irish government, indicating that the Lisbon treaty would not effect changes regarding taxation, military activity, or abortion in Ireland, which led to a second referendum

Changes to the text
Before the amendment, the wording of Article 29.4 of the Constitution of Ireland was:

The Twenty-eighth Amendment amended the text of subsection 3º to read:

Subsections 4º to 11º were deleted and the following were inserted as subsections 4º to 9º

Referendum campaign
A Referendum Commission was established by Minister for the Environment, Heritage and Local Government John Gormley. It was chaired by High Court judge Frank Clarke. Its role was to prepare one or more statements containing a general explanation of the subject matter of the proposal and of the text of the proposal in the amendment bill.

Participants

Opinion polls

Voting
There were 3,078,132 voters on the electoral register. With the exception of some outlying islands that went to the polls two days ahead of the rest of the country, official voting took place on Friday, 2 October 2009 between 07:00 and 22:00. Counting began the following morning at 09:00.

Result

The '± Yes 2008' column shows the percentage point change in the Yes vote compared to the first Lisbon referendum which was rejected in a referendum in 2008.

Reaction
Taoiseach Brian Cowen said Ireland had taken "a decisive step" by passing the referendum. Tánaiste Mary Coughlan said the No vote across her home county, Donegal, was apparent from around a fortnight previously because of "mixed messages". Fine Gael's leader Enda Kenny described it as "a mature, reflective decision". Eamon Gilmore, leader of the Labour Party, said it was both "sensible" and "necessary". President of the European Commission José Manuel Barroso said the vote ensured it was "a great day" for both Ireland and Europe. President of the European Parliament Jerzy Buzek stated that work would now get underway "to overcome the difficulties" that remained.

Declan Ganley, Libertas leader, said the unexpectedly high Yes vote demonstrated "how scared people are" of the state of the economy. This feeling was echoed by a certain proportion of voters, one of whose attitude was "I'm here because I have a vote and, basically, I've been told what to do with it". The Socialist Party's MEP Joe Higgins praised the performance of the No campaign. Sinn Féin's President Gerry Adams asked why the first referendum had been ignored. Sinn Féin Vice-president Mary Lou McDonald criticised the "dishonourable and depressing" Yes campaign. Richard Greene of Cóir promised the war against the Treaty would continue despite the second result, saying Cóir was "extremely disappointed that the voice of the people was not heard the first time around". Václav Klaus, President of the Czech Republic, described the vote as "tarnished since this is a repeated referendum". Nigel Farage, leader of the United Kingdom Independence Party, said the process had been no different from "a corrupt election in Zimbabwe or Afghanistan". Bruce Arnold, a columnist with the Irish Independent, said the damage done to the disenfranchised by the "tainted outcome" of the referendums would "not be easily fixed".

Final formalities
Subsequent to the referendum, the following formalities were observed:
6 October The Provisional Referendum Certificate with the full result of the referendum was published in Iris Oifigiúil. 
8 October The Dáil passed a motion approving the terms of the Treaty under Article 29.5.2° of the Constitution
13 October No petition to the Provisional Referendum Certificate having been lodged with the High Court, the Certificate became final.
15 October President McAleese signed the amendment act into law
16 October President McAleese signed the instrument of ratification of the Treaty
23 October Dick Roche, Minister of State, deposited the instrument of ratification with the Italian government.

See also
 Ratification of the Treaty of Lisbon
 European Commission Representation in Ireland

References

External links

Official websites
Twenty-Eighth Amendment of the Constitution (Treaty of Lisbon) Act 2009
Oireachtas Debates: Twenty-Eighth Amendment of the Constitution (Treaty of Lisbon) Bill 2009
Full text of the Constitution of Ireland
European Union Act 2009
Policies > European Union > Lisbon Treaty Department of Foreign Affairs
The Treaty of Lisbon – National Forum on Europe

Media overviews
Lisbon Treaty – RTÉ
Lisbon 2009 – The Irish Times

2009 elections in Europe
2009 in international relations
2009 in Irish law
2009 in Irish politics
2009 in the European Union
2009 in the Republic of Ireland
Ireland
28
Ireland and the European Union
28
Ireland, 28
Treaty of Lisbon
October 2009 events in Europe
Amendment, 28, 2009